Ram Ratan is a Bollywood romantic comedy film, written by Praful Parekh and directed by Govind Sakariya and produced by Sanjay Patel, Ashwin Patel and Bharat Dodiya, under the banner of Sab Star Movies.

Rishi Bhutani and Daisy Shah will be seen playing lead roles in the film. While Hitler Didi fame Sumit Vats played the role of Happy Singh, protagonists best friend.

Plot
The director of the film Sakariya, said that the film is a romance with a pinch of comedy and thrill.

Cast
Rishi Bhutani as Ram Rathod
Daisy Shah as Ratan Rathod
Kangna Sharma 
Yamini Joshi
Sumit Vats as Happy Singh
Kavya Kiran as Sweety
Mahesh Thakur as Mahendra Rathod, Ram's father
Sudha Chandran as Mrs. Rathod, Ram's mother
Rajpal Yadav as Chhota Tiger
Yaachana Sharma
Angela Krislinzki as Amy
Arvie Gupta
Angel Thakur
Roshni Rajput
Satish Kaushik as Goli bhai
Prashant Rajput
Amit Dimri

Production

Development
The official announcement of the film was announced in the first half of September 2016. The title of the film was said to be Ramratan.

Casting
The makers of the film have decided to cast Rishi Bhutani and Daisy Shah as lead roles along with Mahesh Thakur, Sudha Chandran, Rajpal Yadav, Angy sharma, Sumit Vats, Rituu Sachdev, Angela Krislinzki, Arvie Gupta, Angel Thakur, Roshni Rajput, Satish Kaushik and Amit Dimri as other roles in the film.

Filming
The principal photography of the film commenced on 10 September 2016.

Soundtrack

References

External links
 

2017 films
Indian romantic comedy films
2017 romantic comedy films
2010s Hindi-language films
Films set in Mumbai